Khin Maung Tun is a Burmese football player with Yadanabon FC of the Myanmar National League.

Honours

 Myanmar National League Cup 2009

References

http://www.yadanarbonfc.com/index.php?option=com_content&view=article&id=108&Itemid=86

1980 births
Living people
Burmese footballers
Myanmar international footballers
Burmese expatriate footballers
Burmese sportspeople of Chinese descent
Sportspeople from Yangon
Yadanarbon F.C. players
Association football defenders